The Metro Manila double-decker bus was employed in the 1980s on EDSA. The model most used was the Leyland Atlantean, a double-decker bus chassis manufactured by Leyland between 1958 and 1986. Leyland pioneered the design of rear-engined, front entrance double deck buses in the United Kingdom, allowing for the introduction of one-man operation buses, dispensing with the need for a conductor.

Presently, double-decker buses are used by the Mall of Asia Arena (Higher KLQ6119GSE3 B91H-series) and the Subic Bay Metropolitan Authority (King Long XMQ6110GS). Former operators were Matorco, which introduced such buses to the Philippines, and the Metro Manila Transit Corporation (Leyland Atlantean).

Bus transportation in Metro Manila